Frederick Charles Castle (29 November 1898 – 1974) was an English professional footballer who played in the Football League for Birmingham. He played as a centre forward.

Castle was born in Kings Norton, now a district of Birmingham. He played for Smethwick Highfield before joining Birmingham in April 1925. He made his debut in the First Division in the penultimate game of the 1925–26 season, deputising for George Briggs in a home game against West Ham United which Birmingham won 1–0. He kept his place for the last game of that season, and spent the next season as cover for Briggs. However, Briggs missed only one game, and in August 1927 Castle signed for Shrewsbury Town of the Birmingham & District League.

Castle died in Smethwick, West Midlands, late in 1974.

References

1898 births
1974 deaths
People from Kings Norton
English footballers
Association football forwards
Birmingham City F.C. players
Shrewsbury Town F.C. players
English Football League players